The year 1822 in archaeology involved some significant events.

Explorations

Excavations

Finds
 Turin King List is discovered by Bernardino Drovetti.
 First discoveries of Golasecca culture.
 Smythe's Megalith in England is identified but dismantled.

Publications
  Descriptions of the Ruins of an Ancient City, discovered near Palenque published in London. The first book on the Maya site of Palenque, based on the accounts of Antonio Bernasconi and Antonio del Rio, and illustrated with engravings based on the drawings of Bernasconi and Luciano Castañeda.

Miscellaneous
 September 27 - Jean-François Champollion announces his success in deciphering Egyptian hieroglyphs using the Rosetta Stone in a letter to the Académie des Inscriptions et Belles-Lettres in Paris (based on the work of Thomas Young).

Births
 January 6 - Heinrich Schliemann, excavator of Troy (d. 1890)
 February 23 - Giovanni Battista de Rossi, developed Christian archeology (d. 1894)

Deaths

See also
Ancient Egypt / Egyptology

References

Archaeology
Archaeology by year
Archaeology
Archaeology